Keetmanshoop Urban is a constituency in the ǁKaras Region of Namibia.  It comprises the city of Keetmanshoop, except the Krönlein suburb. It had a population of 19,447 in 2011, up from 15,777 in 2001.  the constituency had 12,569 registered voters, up from 11,534 in 2019.

Politics

Regional and local elections
In the 2015 regional elections Hilma Nicanor of SWAPO, was reelected with 2,291 votes. She had been councillor of Keetmanshoop Urban since 2004 and defeated challengers Fredrik Kuhlmann of the Democratic Turnhalle Alliance (DTA, 551 votes) and Peter John Visser of the Rally for Democracy and Progress (RDP, 378 votes). After councillor Nicanor was fielded as a parliamentary candidate in the 2019 Namibian general election, a by-election became necessary for Keetmannshoop Urban because Namibian electoral law prohibits sitting councillors and members of the public service to run for a seat in parliament.

The by-election was conducted on 15 January 2020. Maxie Minnaar of the Landless People's Movement (LPM, a new party registered in 2018) won with 1,958 votes, followed by Festus Shilimela (SWAPO, 1,306 votes) and Abraham ǀGoagoseb (Popular Democratic Movement, 292 votes). Minnaar died in August 2020. Considering that the next regional election was only months away, the Electoral Commission of Namibia decided to keep the councillor position vacant until then. The 2020 regional election was also won by the LPM. Its candidate Joseph Isaacks obtained 3,016 votes, well ahead of the SWAPO candidate Emrico Blaauw who came second with 1,849 votes.

General elections

|-style="background:#e9e9e9;"
!colspan="5" style="text-align:center"|Namibian general election, 2014
|-style="background:#e9e9e9;"
!colspan="2" style="text-align:left"|Party
!Votes
!%
|-
|
|3,933
|70.4%
|-
|
|550
|9.8%
|-
|
|355
|6.4%
|-
|
|158
|2.8%
|-
|
|135
|2.4%
|-
|
|80
|1.4%
|-
|
|71
|1.3%
|-
|
|63
|1.1%
|-
|
|46
|0.8%
|-
|
|39
|0.7%
|-
|
|37
|0.7%
|-
|
|34
|0.6%
|-
|-style="background:#e9e9e9;"
!colspan="2" style="text-align:left"|Total votes
|5,590
|100.0%
|-
|colspan="2" style="text-align:left"|Registered voters
|10,197
|54.8%
|-
| colspan=7 style="text-align:left;" |Source: Electoral Commission of Namibia
|}

References

Constituencies of ǁKaras Region
Keetmanshoop
States and territories established in 1992
1992 establishments in Namibia